Philip Raphael “Phil” Soussan (born 23 June 1961, London, England) is a British bass guitarist, songwriter and producer who has gained notability as a member of a host of famed rock and roll bands, including some who have been fronted by such vocalists as Ozzy Osbourne, Billy Idol, Vince Neil, Johnny Hallyday and John Waite, as well as a membership in Beggars & Thieves. Soussan has also played in bands featuring Jimmy Page, Steve Lukather, Edgar Winter, and Richie Kotzen.

Career
With Ozzy Osbourne, he played on the 1986 album The Ultimate Sin and co-wrote the hit single "Shot in the Dark".

Soussan initially played with Vince Neil in the fictional band Black Plague, the band formed for the movie The Adventures of Ford Fairlane with Andrew Dice Clay followed by writing and ultimately recording songs on the demo tape to promote the new Vince Neil Band, and the Vince Neil Band's first official album Exposed released in 1993.

As a songwriter he has contributed to all of the bands that he has been with, most notably writing Exposed, the first solo album for Vince Neil, the Luke album for Steve Lukather and "After You're Gone" the opening track to Mindfields the album from Toto.

Recently he has also been a producer and mixer and has worked on projects by Dokken and Toto.

In 2006, he released his highly acclaimed debut solo album entitled Vibrate featuring him singing and playing guitar and bass on original material following it up in 2011 with his second solo album; "No Protection”
Both albums feature songs that have been included in many feature films.

He is currently a member of the supergroup "Big Noize" featuring alongside singer Joe Lynn Turner, guitarist Carlos Cavazo, and drummer Vinny Appice. Cavazo and Soussan previously played together in the band Black Plague. He has just released his latest solo album entitled "No Protection" and is signed to Favored Nations Records

Phil has been featured in several films; as part of the band Black Plague in The Adventures of Ford Fairlane, as himself in Rumble: The Indians Who Rocked the World and “The Life Blood and Rhythm of Randy Castillo”

Soussan is also serving as Vice President of the Grammy Awards also known as NARAS, in the Los Angeles chapter.

After performing together at the "Giving 2010" benefit event on 3 May 2010, Soussan formed the cover band "Carnival of Dogs" with Matt Sorum (Velvet Revolver, Camp Freddy, formerly of Guns N' Roses and The Cult), Franky Perez (Solo, Scars on Broadway, DKFXP) and Tracii Guns (L.A. Guns, formerly of Brides of Destruction).

In 2016 Soussan joined Last in Line, the band formed by other former members of the Dio band, following the death of original bassist Jimmy Bain.

In 2017 Phil was inducted into the RockGodz Hall of Fame.

Selected discography

With Ozzy Osbourne
The Ultimate Sin (1986)

With Billy Idol
Charmed Life (1990)

With Kings of the Sun
 Resurrection (1993)

With Beggars and Thieves
Beggars & Thieves (1990)

With Johnny Hallyday
Rough Town (1994)
Live at La Cigale (1995)
Lorada (1996)
Lorada Tour Live (1996)
Destination Vegas (1997)

With Steve Lukather
Luke (1997)

Other recording and live appearances up to the present
 John Waite
 Richie Kotzen
 Edgar Winter
 Toto
 Jani Lane
 Solo dates – Vibrate, No Protection
 Big Noize (w/Sebastian Bach, George Lynch & Vinny Appice)
 Last in Line
 Diamond Kobra
 Kings of the Sun (band)

References

External links

 Phil Soussan – Official website

1961 births
Living people
English heavy metal bass guitarists
Male bass guitarists
People educated at William Ellis School
The Ozzy Osbourne Band members
Singers from London
Musicians from London